Joel Oshiro Dyck (born July 28, 1971) is a retired Japanese-Canadian professional ice hockey defenceman. He played 15 seasons in the Japan Ice Hockey League and the Asia League Ice Hockey with the Nippon Paper Cranes, and competed at the 2002, 2003, and 2004 IIHF World Championships as a member of the Japan men's national ice hockey team.

Career statistics

References

External links

1971 births
Living people
Asian Games gold medalists for Japan
Asian Games medalists in ice hockey
Calgary Rad'z players
Canadian expatriate ice hockey players in the United States
Canadian ice hockey defencemen
Chatham Wheels players
Ice hockey people from Alberta
Ice hockey players at the 2003 Asian Winter Games
Kamloops Blazers players
Medalists at the 2003 Asian Winter Games
Nippon Paper Cranes players
Regina Pats players
Seattle Thunderbirds players
Sportspeople from Lethbridge
Swift Current Broncos players
Wheeling Thunderbirds players